The Faculty of Engineering and Information Technology at the University of Melbourne is the oldest engineering and information technology faculty in Australia.  It was established in 1861, 8 years after the establishment of the University of Melbourne, and was made a Faculty in 1889.  It teaches a substantial number of undergraduate and postgraduate students (around 4,500, including over 1,400 international students from over 50 countries), as well as being a significant centre for engineering research, employing many leaders in their fields. In 2011 the Faculty of Engineering and Information Technology celebrated its sesquicentenary and the School developed a large range of events and activities to mark the occasion.

Research 
The Faculty of Engineering and Information Technology is one of the largest engineering research institutions in Australia, with a 2010 research income of $90 million. The School conducts leading interdisciplinary research in four key themes – Biomedical, Structured Matter, Information and Communication Systems, and Sustainable Systems and Energy.

The School is home to a range of key research centres, institutes, groups and laboratories, including:

 Advanced Centre for Automotive Research and Testing (ACART)
 ARC Research Network on Intelligent Sensors, Sensor Networks and Information Processing
 Australia-China Centre on Water Resources Research
 Australian Integrated Multimodal EcoSystem (AIMES) 
 Centre for Energy-Efficient Telecommunications
 Centre for Nanoscience and Nanotechnology (CNST)
 Centre for Spatial Data Infrastructures and Land Administration
 Cloud Computing and Distributed Systems (CLOUDS) Laboratory
 CRC for Greenhouse Gas Technologies (CO2CRC)
 CRC for Irrigation Futures
 CRC for Polymers
 CRC for Spatial Information (CRC-SI)
 eWater CRC
 Gait Analysis & Gait Rehabilitation (NHMRC Centre of Clinical Research Excellence)
 Infrastructure Asset Protection and Management
 Institute for a Broadband Enabled Society
 Interaction Design Laboratory
 Melbourne Systems Laboratory
 National ICT Australia (NICTA)
 Neuroengineering Research Laboratory
 Nonlinear Signal Processing Lab
 Particulate Fluids Processing Centre (PFPC) (ARC Special Research Centre)
 Peer-to-Peer Networks and Applications Research Laboratory
 Research Network for a Secure Australia (RNSA)
 Uniwater

Deans of the Faculty

The Kernot Memorial Medal 
The Kernot Memorial Medal honours distinguished engineering achievement in Australia, and was established in memory of Professor William Charles Kernot, the first professor of Engineering at the University of Melbourne. The award is made by the University of Melbourne's Faculty of Engineering and IT following the recommendation of a selection committee. This committee comprises the Heads of Schools within the Faculty, and two members who do not hold teaching or research appointments in the University. It is open to persons resident in Australia for at least five out of the last seven years before the award. Throughout its history, the Kernot Memorial Medal has been presented to many distinguished Australian engineers.

Recipients of The Kernot Memorial Medal 
 1926 F W Clements
 1927 R W Chapman
 1928 M E Kernot
 1929 J N Reeson
 1930 John Monash
 1931 G K Williams 
 1932 J R Kemp
 1933 J J C Bradfield
 1934 H R Harper
 1935 E G Ritchie
 1936 F W H Wheadon
 1937 A G Michell
 1938 George Julius
 1939 C F Broadhead
 1943 Essington Lewis
 1944 C S Steele
 1945 D McVey
 1946 J G Burnell
 1947 T H Upton
 1948 W E Bassett
 1949 L R East
 1950 A K Hacke
 1951 C H Kernot
 1952 R J Dumas
 1953 E D Shaw
 1954 H Hey
 1955 L F Loder 
 1956 W Nimmo 
 1957 W H Connolly
 1958 William Hudson
 1959 Lawrence Wackett
 1960 D V Darwin
 1961 A J Keast 
 1962 B B Lewis
 1963 A W Knight 
 1964 Lindesay Clark 
 1965 Maurice Mawby
 1966 Philip Baxter 
 1967 J A L Matheson
 1968 L P Coombes
 1969 George Fischer
 1970 Ian McLennan
 1971 I Langlands
 1972 Robert Blackwood
 1973 H K Worner
 1974 D M Myers
 1975 James Foots
 1976 John Holland
 1977 Brian Inglis
 1978 Frank Espie
 1979 Kenneth Hunt
 1980 John W Connell 
 1981 H W Worner 
 1982 Bernard Callinan 
 1983 Arthur J Francis
 1984 David H Trollope
 1985 F Belgiorno-Nettis
 1986 S R Siemon
 1987 P T Fink
 1988 Brian Loton
 1989 Arvi Parbo
 1990 H Wragge
 1991 H R C Pratt 
 1992 G P Cook
 1993 O E Potter
 1994 John M Schubert 
 1995 Robert H Brown 
 1996 Robin J Batterham
 1997 Jorg Imberger 
 1998 Ian Vaughan 
 1999 P Boland 
 2007 Don M Grant
 2011 Jim Fox

Supporters of the Faculty
The engineering school has benefited from close links to industry including donations for its research from a number of engineering companies such as Hardcastle & Richards.

References

External links
Faculty of Engineering and Information Technology

Engineering universities and colleges in Australia
Brutalist architecture in Australia
1861 establishments in Australia